Major General Sir Christopher John Airy,  (born 8 March 1934) is a retired British Army officer who served as general officer commanding the London District and Major-General commanding the Household Division from 1986 to 1989.

Military career
Educated at Marlborough College and the Royal Military Academy Sandhurst, Airy was commissioned into the Grenadier Guards in 1954.

Airy became personal military assistant to the Secretary of State for War in 1960, deputy assistant adjutant-general and regimental adjutant in 1967 and brigade major of 4th Guards Brigade in 1971. In 1974 he transferred to the Scots Guards in 1974 on appointment as commanding officer of the 1st Battalion of the Scots Guards. Two years later he became Military Assistant to the Master-General of the Ordnance.

In 1979 he became commander of the 5th Field Force, and in 1982 assistant chief of staff at United Kingdom Land Forces.

Promoted to major-general in 1983, he served at the Royal College of Defence Studies, before becoming Major-General commanding the Household Division and General Officer Commanding London District in 1986. He retired in 1989. 

He was appointed a Commander of the Order of the British Empire in 1984, and a Knight Commander of the Royal Victorian Order in 1989.

Family
Airy married Judith Stephenson in 1959 and has one son and two daughters. His daughter-in-law Lucinda is a granddaughter of Edward Clive Bigham, 3rd Viscount Mersey and Katherine Petty-FitzMaurice, Lady Nairne, eldest daughter of the 6th Marquess of Lansdowne.

References

|-

1934 births
Living people
Graduates of the Royal College of Defence Studies
People educated at Marlborough College
Graduates of the Royal Military Academy Sandhurst
Grenadier Guards officers
Scots Guards officers
Knights Commander of the Royal Victorian Order
Commanders of the Order of the British Empire
British Army major generals
Members of the Household of the Prince of Wales